Dabulian  is a village in Kapurthala district of Punjab State, India. The village is administrated by a Sarpanch, who is an elected representative.

Demography 
According to the report published by Census India in 2011, Dhabulian has a total number of 148 houses and population of 807 of which include 417 males and 390 females. Literacy rate of Dhabulian is 74.80%, lower than state average of 75.84%.  The population of children under the age of 6 years is 69 which is  8.55% of total population of Dhabulian, and child sex ratio is approximately  971, higher than state average of 846.

Caste  
The village has schedule caste (SC) constitutes 40.89% of total population of the village and it doesn't have any Schedule Tribe (ST) population,

Population data

Air travel connectivity 
The closest airport to the village is Sri Guru Ram Dass Jee International Airport.

Villages in Kapurthala

External links
  Villages in Kapurthala
 Kapurthala Villages List

References

Villages in Kapurthala district